Jim Copeland (born January 2, 1939) is a retired Canadian football player who played for the Toronto Argonauts, Montreal Alouettes and Saskatchewan Roughriders. He played college football at the University of Utah.

References

Living people
1939 births
Players of Canadian football from Ontario
Canadian football running backs
Canadian football defensive backs
Montreal Alouettes players
Saskatchewan Roughriders players
Toronto Argonauts players
Sportspeople from Windsor, Ontario